Witt is a poetry collection by Patti Smith, published in 1973.

Contents 
 "Notice"
 "Witt"
 "October 20"
 "Dragnet"
 "Dream of Rimbaud"
 "To Remember Debbie Denise"
 "Sonnet"
 "Mock Death"
 "What Makes Ruda Ivory"
 "Rape"
 "Georgia O'Keeffe"
 "Mustang"
 "Conch"
 "Soul Jive"
 "Picasso Laughing"
 "Gibralto"
 "Precious Little"
 "Notice 2"
 "Judith Revisited"
 "Balance"
 "Prayer"
 "Translators"

Notes

External links 
 

American poetry collections
Poetry by Patti Smith
1973 poetry books
Books by Patti Smith